James Albert "Long Jim" McDonald (April 3, 1870 – March 20, 1957) was a Canadian politician. He served in the Legislative Assembly of British Columbia from 1927 to 1928 from the electoral district of Nelson, a member of the Liberal party. He also served as Mayor of Nelson where he ran a fruit jam factory.

References

1870 births
1957 deaths